Melartin is a surname. Notable people with the surname include:

Erik Gabriel Melartin (1780–1847), Finnish archbishop
Erkki Melartin (1875–1937), Finnish composer

Finnish-language surnames